The Brandywine Wildflower and Native Plant Gardens are gardens at the Brandywine River Museum, located on U.S. Route 1 beside the Brandywine Creek in Chadds Ford, Pennsylvania.

The gardens were established in 1974 to a design by F. M. Mooberry. In 1979 Lady Bird Johnson dedicated the gardens to Ford B. Draper and Henry A. Thouron for their contributions to the Brandywine Conservancy.

The gardens include wildflowers, trees, and shrubs set within landscaped woodlands, wetland, flood plain, and meadow.

See also 
 List of botanical gardens in the United States

External links 
 Brandywine Wildflower and Native Plant Gardens

Botanical gardens in Pennsylvania
Parks in Delaware County, Pennsylvania
Chadds Ford Township, Delaware County, Pennsylvania
1974 establishments in Pennsylvania